Jack is a Canadian television film, which debuted on CBC Television on March 10, 2013. A biopic of the late Jack Layton, the film stars Rick Roberts as Layton and Sook-Yin Lee as Olivia Chow. The film was originally announced in 2012 as Smilin' Jack: The Jack Layton Story.

The film was directed by Jeff Woolnough, and written by Shelley Eriksen and Andrew Wreggitt. The Parachute Club's 1983 hit single "Rise Up" is the opening theme music.

Both Roberts and Lee won Canadian Screen Awards for their performances at the 2nd Canadian Screen Awards, Roberts as Best Lead Actor in a Television Film or Miniseries and Lee as Best Lead Actress in a Television Film or Miniseries.

Cast
Rick Roberts as Jack Layton
Sook-Yin Lee as Olivia Chow
Zachary Bennett as Brad Lavigne
Joel S. Keller as Karl Bélanger
Wendy Crewson as Anne McGrath
Judah Katz as Brian Topp

Victoria Snow, Brittany Scobie, Conrad Sweatman, Erin Karpluk and Diana Ha also appeared.

Production and filming
Film for Jack was announced on November 17, 2011. Jack  was filmed in Winnipeg.

Reception
The Globe and Mail called Jack a "varnished version of Mr. Layton", while John Doyle of the same periodical, wrote "[Jack Layton] moved us; the biopic [on him], not so much".

References

External links

Biographical films about politicians
Canadian biographical drama films
2013 biographical drama films
CBC Television original films
Films shot in Winnipeg
2013 in Canadian television
2013 television films
2013 films
Cultural depictions of Canadian men
Cultural depictions of politicians
English-language Canadian films
Films directed by Jeff Woolnough
Canadian drama television films
Canadian films based on actual events
2010s Canadian films